George Albert Tuck (April 12, 1882 – August 22, 1952) was a college basketball player for the Minnesota Golden Gophers.  Tuck, a center, was one of the two first Big Ten Conference basketball players to be named as an All-American, along with Christian Steinmetz, when he made the team in 1905. Minnesota won the first 29 games of Tuck's career and finished with a record of 45–9–1 during his time as a Golden Gopher. Tuck also played for Minnesota's football team.

References

1882 births
1952 deaths
All-American college men's basketball players
Basketball players from Minneapolis
Centers (basketball)
Minnesota Golden Gophers football players
Minnesota Golden Gophers men's basketball players
Players of American football from Minneapolis
American men's basketball players